Toby Shaw is an American television news producer.

Biography

Early life and education
Toby Shaw was born in McConnellsburg, Pennsylvania.

Career and hobbies
Shaw is a four time Emmy award-winning news producer and is Managing Editor for KIVI-TV in Boise, Idaho. 

Shaw served as the Idaho Regional Chair for the Northwest chapter of the National Academy of Television Arts and Sciences between 2018 and 2022. https://www.natasnw.org/board-of-governors/

Marriage and children

Shaw's wife, Brenda Leap, is a photographer.  http://leapphotography.com/#!/HOME

Awards
2007: Northwest Region Emmy Award, Evening News (Markets 81+)
2008: Northwest Region Emmy Award, Evening News (Markets 81+)
2009: Northwest Region Emmy Award, Evening News (Markets 81+)

References

Year of birth missing (living people)
Living people
American television producers